Myoko may refer to:

 Myōkō, Niigata, a city in Japan
 Mount Myōkō, a volcano located in Niigata Prefecture, Japan
 Japanese cruiser Myōkō, a former cruiser of the Imperial Japanese Navy
 JDS Myōkō (DDG-175), a guided missile destroyer of the Japan Maritime Self-Defense Force
 Myōkō (train), a train service in Japan